David Drury may refer to:

 David Drury (cricketer) (born 1961), former English cricketer
 David Drury (fencer), British fencer
 David Drury (musician) (born 1961), musician in Sydney, Australia
 David Drury (director), British director of films and television series